Masterpiece Theatre is the second studio album by Canadian rock group Marianas Trench. It was released on February 24, 2009, in Canada and September 28, 2010, in the United States. The album was available for preview at MuchMusic's website before the release. The last song on the album, titled "Masterpiece Theatre III", is a collage of all the songs on the album including its five singles.

The album is a slight departure from Fix Me, containing more theatrical elements and instruments while still retaining the punk rock influence of its predecessor. The songs "Masterpiece Theatre" (I, II, and III), "Beside You", and "Good To You" show some experimentation using pianos, strings, and harmonies.

The album sold 5,000 copies in its first week of release debuting at No. 4 on the Canadian Albums Chart and since then it has reached Double Platinum status in Canada with sales of over 80,000 copies nationwide.

Reception

Critical reception
Masterpiece Theatre was received well by most critics. The Phoenix New Times praised lead singer Josh Ramsay and the lyrics saying "Singer Josh Ramsay pushed himself vocally on this album, and the lyrics were very heartfelt and meaningful – not your typical pop-punk music."

Melodic.net said, "this album is one of the best, if not the best, discs I've heard in the past year or two." They also said "The harmonies, arrangements, and different styles experimented with throughout the spread of the CD are absolutely awe-inspiring."

Lost In the Sound gave the album a score of 80% out 100, saying that the album "is one of the best in its genre and proves that there is still good pop rock music out there."

Commercial performance
The album sold over 160,000 copies in Canada and was certified Double Platinum by Music Canada. Singles such as "All To Myself" and "Cross My Heart" peaked in the top 15 of the Canadian Hot 100. Other singles such as "Celebrity Status", "Good to You" and "Beside You" peaked in the top 40 of the Canadian Hot 100.

Track listing

Personnel
Credits for Masterpiece Theatre adapted from Allmusic.

Musicians

Marianas Trench
 Josh Ramsay – lead vocals, rhythm guitar, piano, keyboards, programming, drums, flugelhorn, production, bass engineering, guitar engineering, composer
 Matt Webb – lead guitar, piano, keyboards, programming, trombone, vocals
 Mike Ayley – bass guitar, trumpet, vocals
 Ian Casselman – drums, sousaphone, percussion, vocals

Guest musicians
 Kate Voegele – vocals
 Jessica Lee – vocals
 Steve Marshall – vocals
 Sara Ramsay – vocals
 Corlynn Ramsay - vocals
 Miles Ramsay – vocals, string arrangements
 Gillian Mott - violin
 Elyse Jacobson – violin
 Joshua Belvedere – viola
 Doug Gorkoff – cello
 Rick Killburn – double bass
 Shane Wilson – drums
 John Stamos – guest appearance
 Shawn Smith – composer

Production

 Dave Genn – production, engineering
 Raine Maida – production, engineering
 Greig Nori – production, engineering
 Dave Ogilvie – production, mixing
 Ted Jensen – mastering
 Mike Fraser – mixing
 Scott Ternan – bass engineering, drum engineering, guitar engineering, piano engineering, string engineering
 Dean Maher – drum engineering, piano engineering
 Mark Maryanovich – cover art, photography

 Natalie Simon – stylist
 Jonathan Simkin – A&R
 Zack Blacktone – assistant
 Brendon Brown – assistant
 Mike Cashin – assistant
 Andrew Conroy - assistant
 Brock MacFarlane – assistant
 Eric Mosher – assistant
 Jeremy Patch – assistant
 Dusty Schaller – assistant
 Rob Stefanson – assistant

Charts and certifications

Album charts

Certifications

Awards and nominations

|-
| 2009 || "Cross My Heart" || MuchMusic Video Awards Favourite Canadian Video|| 
|-
| 2009 || "Cross My Heart" || MuchMusic Video Awards MUCH LOUD Rock Video of the Year|| 
|-
| 2009 || "Cross My Heart" || MuchMusic Video Awards UR Fave Video|| 
|-
| 2009 || "Cross My Heart" || MuchMusic Video Awards Director of the Year|| 
|-
| 2009 || Masterpiece Theatre || Western Canadian Music Awards Pop Recording of the Year||  
|-
| 2010 || "Cross My Heart" || Independent Music Awards Astral Media Radio Favourite Single||  
|-
| 2010 || "Cross My Heart" || Independent Music Awards Favourite Video||  
|-
| 2010 || Marianas Trench || Independent Music Awards Favourite Pop Artist/Group||  
|-
| 2010 || Marianas Trench || Canadian Radio Music Award Fan's Choice Award||  
|-
| 2010 || "Celebrity Status" || MuchMusic Video Awards UR Fave Video|| 
|-
| 2010 || "Celebrity Status" || MuchMusic Video Awards Pop Video of the Year|| 
|-

Release history

Singles

Cross My Heart
"Cross My Heart" is the fourth single released by Marianas Trench and the first single released off of their second album Masterpiece Theatre.

Music video

Shot in Vancouver, Canada, the music video starts off with Josh Ramsay singing to a woman that he is following throughout the course of the video. While going down the street, people start to hear the song, and follow along. From painters and construction workers, to teenagers from the streets, they all form a parade with the rest of the band playing on a float. In the end, the woman being followed takes out her headphones, and hears Josh singing to her. She turns around and sees the crowd cheering and applauding to her. She invites him in, the song ends and the crowd stops cheering.

Notes
 Was the "Best Comeback" on the January 31 issue on the Canadian Hot 100.
 Was the "Sales Gainer" on the February 14 issue on the Canadian Hot 100.
 Was certified 2× Platinum in Canada with 80,000 digital downloads across the country

Chart positions
"Cross My Heart" debuted at No. 54 on the Canadian Hot 100 and then rose No. 41 the next week, but then fell off the chart two weeks later. On the issue of January 31 it made a re-entry on the chart at No. 42 and was the "Best Comeback" and climbed to No. 16, and was the "Sales Gainer" on the issue of February 14, since then it has peaked at #15.

All to Myself
"All to Myself" is the fifth single released by Marianas Trench and the second single released off of their second album Masterpiece Theatre.

Chart positions
It was the Greatest Gainer for the week of June 13, 2009 on the Canadian Hot 100.

Beside You
"Beside You" is the third single (second in the United States) of the Marianas Trench's second album, Masterpiece Theatre.

It was released in September 2009 in Canada, and March 2011 in the U.S. The band went on tour with Carly Rae Jepsen, The New Cities, and The Mission District to promote the song.

Music video

The music video for "Beside You" was shot on September 29, 2009. The beginning shots of the beach and dock were filmed at Jericho Beach in Vancouver, British Columbia. The rest of the video was shot inside of the Chan Centre for the Performing Arts at the University of British Columbia. The orchestra and band members in the video are students from Lord Byng Secondary School.

"Beside You" premiered on Much Music's Much on Demand on October 30, 2009.

Charts

Celebrity Status
"Celebrity Status" is the fourth single off Marianas Trench's second studio album, Masterpiece Theatre. It was released to radio stations in February 2010, and was released digitally onto iTunes on April 6, 2010. The song was featured along with Pink's "Raise Your Glass" in the University of British Columbia's lipdub video released on April 8, 2011.

Charts

Good To You
"Good To You" is the fifth and final single off Marianas Trench's second studio album, Masterpiece Theatre. It was released on August 10, 2010, to both iTunes and the radio.

Charts

References

External links
 
 http://www.marianastrench.net/news/beside-you-tour-poster

2009 albums
604 Records albums
Albums recorded at Armoury Studios
Albums recorded at Hipposonic Studios
Albums recorded at The Warehouse Studio
Concept albums
Marianas Trench (band) albums
Rock operas